The Great Meadows Regional School District is a regional public school district in Warren County, New Jersey, United States, that serves students in pre-kindergarten through eighth grade from Independence and Liberty townships. The New Jersey Superior Court, Appellate Division blocked a 2007 effort by Liberty Township to leave the Great Meadows district based on Liberty's greater share of district costs, with the court citing the inability of the two communities to provide an efficient education separately.

As of the 2018–19 school year, the district, comprised of three schools, had an enrollment of 662 students and 73.0 classroom teachers (on an FTE basis), for a student–teacher ratio of 9.1:1.

The district is classified by the New Jersey Department of Education as being in District Factor Group "GH", the third-highest of eight groupings. District Factor Groups organize districts statewide to allow comparison by common socioeconomic characteristics of the local districts. From lowest socioeconomic status to highest, the categories are A, B, CD, DE, FG, GH, I and J.

Students attending public school for ninth through twelfth grades attend Hackettstown High School which serves students from Hackettstown, along with students from the townships of Allamuchy and Liberty, as part of a sending/receiving relationship with the Hackettstown School District. As of the 2018–19 school year, the high school had an enrollment of 828 students and 68.6 classroom teachers (on an FTE basis), for a student–teacher ratio of 12.1:1.

Schools 
Schools in the district (with 2018–19 school year enrollment from the National Center for Education Statistics) are:
Elementary schools
Central Elementary School with 221 students in grades PreK-2
Michael Mai, Principal
Liberty Elementary School with 204 students in grades 3-5
Jennifer Macones, Principal
Middle school
Great Meadows Middle School with 239 students in grades 6-8
Israel Marmolejos, Principal

Administration 
Core members of the district's administration are:
David Mango, Superintendent
Angela Moyer, Business Administrator / Board Secretary

Board of education
The district's board of education, comprised of nine members, sets policy and oversees the fiscal and educational operation of the district through its administration. As a Type II school district, the board's trustees are elected directly by voters to serve three-year terms of office on a staggered basis, with three seats up for election each year held (since 2013) as part of the November general election. The board appoints a superintendent to oversee the district's day-to-day operations and a business administrator to supervise the business functions of the district. Seats on the board of education are allocated based on the population of the constituent municipalities, with six from Independence Township and three from Liberty Township, who are elected to office on a staggered basis with one seat from Liberty Township and two from Independence Township up for election each year. A member represents the Board on the Hackettstown Board of Education to deal with issues pertaining to Hackettstown High School and the Hackettstown School District.

References

External links 
Great Meadows Regional School District

Data for the Great Meadows Regional School District, National Center for Education Statistics

Independence Township, New Jersey
Liberty Township, New Jersey
New Jersey District Factor Group GH
School districts in Warren County, New Jersey